Céline une seule fois / Live 2013 is a live album/home video by Canadian singer, Celine Dion. It was released on 16 May 2014 as a three-disc set (2CD/DVD and 2CD/Blu-ray). The album/video was recorded on 27 July 2013 on the historic Plains of Abraham in Quebec City during the one-night only Céline... une seule fois show. The CD also includes four bonus tracks recorded in Paris during Dion's sold-out Tournée Européenne 2013 in November and December 2013.

"Celle qui m'a tout appris" was released as a single in April 2014 to promote the new album. The trailer for Céline une seule fois / Live 2013 premiered on 28 April 2014 and the music video for "Celle qui m'a tout appris" was uploaded onto Dion's official Vevo channel on 6 May 2014. Céline une seule fois / Live 2013 reached top ten on the album charts in France, Canada, Belgium Wallonia and China.

Background
On 29 March 2013, Dion's official website announced that the singer will perform on the Plains of Abraham in Quebec City on 27 July 2013. 2 April 2013 press release stated that Dion is preparing a one-time special event for Quebec City, her only show outside Las Vegas. She will perform her greatest hits in a show named Céline… une seule fois and the concert will be 80% French and 20% English songs. On 16 April 2013, it was revealed that Dion will perform songs from as far back as her 1987 Incognito album, including hits from D'eux and tracks from her 2012 album Sans attendre. Dion already performed on the Plains of Abraham on 22 August 2008 in front of 250,000 spectators and a DVD with this show titled Céline sur les Plaines was released on 11 November 2008. On 23 April 2013, her official website announced in another press release that Dion will return to France and Belgium in November 2013 for a limited number of exceptional shows, the only ones scheduled in Europe after her 2008's Taking Chances World Tour. Dion will tour to celebrate the success of Sans attendre, which has sold over 1.5 million copies worldwide. The set list for the Céline… une seule fois concert was revealed on 24 May 2013. On 19 June 2013, after selling out all seven dates of the Sans attendre Tour in Belgium and France, Dion added another concert on 4 December 2013. Later, a ninth and last date was added as well.

Céline... une seule fois was planned for 60,000 people but in order to ensure comfort and safety, only 42,495 tickets were available and they all sold-out. It took 10,000 hours to install the gigantic stage.  Measuring 224 ft (68m) long by 86 ft (26m) wide and weighing 300,000 pounds (136 tons), it was the largest stage in Canada. Dion decided to have a "rock" look with a good dose of glamour and wore during her concert creations by Balmain, Atelier Versace, Elie Saab and Alexandre Vauthier. The actual set list performed in Quebec City differed slightly to the one published before the event. Dion did not perform "Rolling in the Deep", "The Prayer" and "Regarde-moi" from D'eux (out of respect for the victims of the recent Lac-Mégantic derailment, as the song's lyrics refer to a train going out of control). Instead she sang the title track from her upcoming English album "Loved Me Back to Life", "Ce n'était qu'un rêve" and Félix Leclerc's "Bozo". While in Quebec City for the concert, Dion was presented the Companion to the Order of Canada, the highest civilian honour in the country, by the Governor General in a ceremony at the Citadel. On 8 August 2013, René Angélil and Dion announced that many elements from the concert in Quebec will be incorporated into the concerts in Europe, a large part of the same repertoire will be used, but in a different way. In Europe, Dion did not perform "Ce n'était qu'un rêve", "Bozo", "Je n'ai pas besoin d'amour" from Sans attendre and "Je danse dans ma tête/Des mots qui sonnent/Incognito" medley. Instead she sang: "Where Does My Heart Beat Now", "Water and a Flame", "At Seventeen", "Un garçon pas comme les autres (Ziggy)", "Regarde-moi", "Tout l'or des hommes", "Je ne vous oublie pas" and "Immensité".

Content
On 14 April 2014, Dion's official website announced that the one-night only Céline... une seule fois show on the historic Plains of Abraham in Quebec City will be released on 19 May 2014. The set titled Céline une seule fois / Live 2013 will include a DVD/Blu-ray of the entire concert and two live CDs which also include four bonus tracks from Dion's 2013 sold-out Paris shows. The show opens with "Ce n'était qu'un rêve", Dion's debut single from 1981, and contains her greatest hits, including tracks from her recent commercially successful French-language release Sans attendre and the world debut of the single "Loved Me Back to Life" from her same-titled album, released later that year. Taped shortly after the Lac-Mégantic derailment, Dion dedicated the show to the victims of the train crash that killed forty-seven on 6 July 2013. The four bonus tracks include: "Tout l'or des hommes", "Un garçon pas comme les autres (Ziggy)", "Water and a Flame" and "Regarde-moi" from D'eux. The concert also includes duet with Jean-Marc Couture on "J'irai où tu iras". Couture, winner of Star Académie in 2012, was also the opening act for Céline... une seule fois. The performance of "Loved Me Back to Life" was used as a music video for this single and released on 18 September 2013.

Singles
"Celle qui m'a tout appris" was chosen as the first single from Céline une seule fois / Live 2013 and fourth from Sans attendre. On 8 April 2014, it was sent to radio in France. On 29 April 2014, the song was also released to Canadian radio stations. The music video for "Celle qui m'a tout appris" taken from the Céline... une seule fois concert was uploaded onto Dion's official Vevo channel on 6 May 2014.

Promotion
On 10 August 2013, Céline... une seule fois became available on Quebec's Vidéotron pay TV and pay-per-view (PPV). On 29 November 2013, the concert re-titled Celine Dion Only Once was broadcast in Latin America on DirecTV (Argentina, Chile, Colombia, Ecuador, Peru and Venezuela). In December 2013, it was also broadcast on three European channels: Swiss RTS Deux (24 December), French D8 (25 December) and Belgian La Une (31 December; rebroadcast on 5 January 2014). On 20 April 2014, Céline... une seule fois  was broadcast on TVA in Canada. It was later nominated for the Félix Award for Television Show of the Year - Music but lost to La Voix. The trailer for Céline une seule fois / Live 2013 was uploaded onto Dion's official Vevo channel on 28 April 2014. Four days later, Dion's official website released photos from the Céline une seule fois / Live 2013 booklet.

Commercial performance
Céline une seule fois / Live 2013 was released in selected countries as an audio/video combo but charted on the album charts only. It peaked inside top ten in France (number two), Belgium Wallonia (number four), Canada (number ten on the Canadian Albums Chart and number four in Quebec) and China (number one on the Western Albums Chart and number three on the Overall Albums Chart). Céline une seule fois / Live 2013 has sold 18,547 copies in the first week in France, and debuted at the second position, losing to Coldplay's Ghost Stories. In Canada, it has sold 5,319 units in the first week and entered the Canadian Albums Chart at number ten. In the second week, the album fell to number three in France selling 10,271 copies and went down to number fourteen in Canada with sales of 2,032 units. In the third and fourth week in France, Céline une seule fois / Live 2013 fell to number eight and fourteen, selling 5,200 and 4,500 copies respectively. The album was certified Gold in 2014. It also reached number eleven on the main chart in Switzerland (and number five on the Romandy chart), and peaked inside top forty in the Netherlands, Belgium Flanders, Italy and on the Korean International Albums Chart.

Track listings

Charts

Weekly charts

Year-end charts

Certifications and sales

Release history

References

External links

2014 live albums
2014 video albums
Celine Dion live albums
Celine Dion video albums
Live video albums